Madame X is a 1937 American drama film, a sanitized remake of several Pre-Code films of the same name. It was directed by Sam Wood, with additional direction by Gustav Machatý (uncredited). The film is based on the 1908 play by French playwright Alexandre Bisson (1848–1912).

Plot
A woman who cheated on her loving husband is thrown out of her home by said husband. Twenty years later, she finds herself accused of murder for saving her son, who does not know who she is, as he was raised without her. He finds himself defending her without knowing her background.

Cast
 Gladys George as Jacqueline Fleuriot, aka Miss Pran and Madame X
 Warren William as Bernard Fleuriot
 John Beal as Raymond Fleuriot
 Reginald Owen as Maurice Dourel
 William Henry as Hugh Fariman, Jr.
 Henry Daniell as Lerocle
 Phillip Reed as Jean Rochin
 Lynne Carver as Helene
 Emma Dunn as Rose, Fleuriot's housekeeper
 Ruth Hussey as Annette
 Luis Alberni as Scipio
 George Zucco as Dr. LaFarge
 Cora Witherspoon as Nora
 Jonathan Hale as Hugh Fariman, Sr.
 Arthur Blake as Ferguson

See also
 Madame X

References

External links

 
 
 
 

1937 films
1937 drama films
American drama films
American black-and-white films
Films directed by Sam Wood
Films directed by Gustav Machatý 
American films based on plays
Metro-Goldwyn-Mayer films
1930s English-language films
1930s American films